The Great Synagogue was the main synagogue of the Jewish community in Zhovkva (Zółkiew). It was built between 1692 and 1698 with a financial loan from King John III Sobieski, and was hence also known as the Sobieski Shul.

The building's roof and most of its interior were destroyed during the Holocaust. It was afterwards used as a warehouse. Partial rebuilding was carried out in 1955–1956 and 1992, but the synagogue has continued to deteriorate nonetheless. It was included in the 2000 World Monuments Watch.

References

Religious buildings and structures completed in 1698
17th-century synagogues
Fortress synagogues
Synagogues destroyed by Nazi Germany